Sean Christopher Lawrence (born September 2, 1970) is a retired Major League Baseball pitcher. He played during one season at the major league level for the Pittsburgh Pirates. He was drafted by the Pirates in the 6th round of the  amateur draft.

References
"Sean Lawrence Statistics". The Baseball Cube. 15 January 2008.
"Sean Lawrence Statistics". Baseball-Reference. 15 January 2008.

1970 births
Living people
Pittsburgh Pirates players
Nashville Sounds players
Major League Baseball pitchers
St. Francis Fighting Saints baseball players
Baseball players from Illinois
Schaumburg Flyers players
Augusta Pirates players
Calgary Cannons players
American expatriate baseball players in Canada
Carolina Mudcats players
Lynchburg Hillcats players
Mat-Su Miners players
Portland Beavers players
Salem Buccaneers players
Tucson Sidewinders players
Vancouver Canadians players
Welland Pirates players